Chiringa is a town in Malawi.

Location
The geographical coordinates of Chiringa, Malawi are 15°46'32.0"S, 35°46'02.0"E (Latitude:-15.775556; Longitude:35.767222).

Overview
The Migowi–Chiringa Road is already tarmacked, as of May 2019.

There is a post office and a branch of First Discount House Bank in Chiringa. Chiringa, like many localities in the country, is water stressed. This photograph shows a power truck drilling a borehole in Chiringa, Malawi.

Notable people
 Ken Lipenga: Member of Parliament for Phalombe East Constituency, was born in Chiringa on 14 February 1952.

See also
Mulanje

References

External links
 Government Begins Bituminizing Chiringa-Muloza Road Connecting Mulanje And Phalombe As at 7 May 2019. 

Populated places in Malawi
Southern Region, Malawi